Ahmed Rashid (born 1936) is a Pakistani boxer. He competed in the men's bantamweight event at the 1956 Summer Olympics.

References

External links
 

1936 births
Living people
Pakistani male boxers
Olympic boxers of Pakistan
Boxers at the 1956 Summer Olympics
Place of birth missing (living people)
Bantamweight boxers